White Cliffs may refer to:

 The White Cliffs of Dover in the southeast of the United Kingdom
 "(There'll Be Bluebirds Over) The White Cliffs of Dover", a popular World War II song
 The White Cliffs of Dover (film), a 1944 American film
 White Cliffs, New South Wales, an opal-mining town in Australia
 White Cliffs Solar Power Station, the town's main source of electricity between 1982 and 2004
 White Cliffs, New Mexico, a census-designated place in the United States
 White Cliffs, a series of cliffs in southern Utah formed from the Navajo Sandstone formation
 White Cliffs, the former summer house of Daniel B. Wesson in Northborough, Massachusetts

See also
 Whitecliff, an area in Poole, Dorset, England
 Whitecliffs, a small town in the Canterbury region of New Zealand's South Island